Black nightshade is a common name for several plants and may refer to:

 Solanum americanum (American black nightshade) of much of North America
 Solanum nigrum (European black nightshade) of Europe
 Solanum ptychanthum (Eastern black nightshade) of the Caribbean region